These are the official results of the men's 4 × 100 metres relay event at the 1992 Summer Olympics in Barcelona, Spain. There were a total number of 25 nations competing.

Medalists

* Athletes who participated in the heats only and received medals.

Records
These were the standing world and Olympic records (in seconds) prior to the 1992 Summer Olympics.

The United States set a new world record in the final.

Final
Held on August 8, 1992

Semifinals
 Heat 1

 Heat 2

Heats
First 3 teams of each heat (Q) and the next 4 fastest (q) qualified for the final.

See also
 1990 Men's European Championships 4 × 100 m Relay (Split)
 1991 Men's World Championships 4 × 100 m Relay (Tokyo)
 1993 Men's World Championships 4 × 100 m Relay (Stuttgart)
 1994 Men's European Championships 4 × 100 m Relay (Helsinki)

References

External links
 Official Report
 Results

R
Relay foot races at the Olympics
Men's events at the 1992 Summer Olympics